Sherril V. Schell (1877–1964) was a U.S. born architectural and portrait photographer active in London during the earliest decades of the twentieth century. Amongst the subjects he photographed was Rupert Brooke.

References

External links

 The Metropolitan Museum of Art Wall St photograph
 Review of Schell by Stéphane-Jacques Addade

Photographers from London
Architectural photographers
American portrait photographers
American emigrants to the United Kingdom